Ahmed Hisham Abdul-Munam is a Jordanian footballer of Palestinian origin who plays for Sahab. He is one of the sons of former Jordanian football star Hisham Abdul-Munam.

International career
He played his first international match against United Arab Emirates in the 2016 King's Cup in Bangkok on 3 June 2016, which Jordan Won 3-1.

International career statistics

International goals

Under-23

References

External links

Jordanian footballers
Association football forwards
Jordanian expatriate footballers
Jordanian expatriate sportspeople in Kuwait
Al Jahra SC players
Jordanian people of Palestinian descent
Living people
Jordan international footballers
Jordan youth international footballers
Expatriate footballers in Kuwait
Al-Wehdat SC players
Shabab Al-Aqaba Club players
Sahab SC players
1993 births
Sportspeople from Amman
Kuwait Premier League players
Jordanian Pro League players